Hadrien Salvan (born 10 July 1997) is a French swimmer. He competed in the men's 4 × 200 metre freestyle relay at the 2020 Summer Olympics.

References

External links
 

1997 births
Living people
French male freestyle swimmers
Olympic swimmers of France
Swimmers from Paris
Swimmers at the 2020 Summer Olympics
European Aquatics Championships medalists in swimming
20th-century French people
21st-century French people